Nathan Masler Adcock (born February 25, 1988) is an American former professional baseball pitcher. He played in Major League Baseball (MLB) for the Kansas City Royals, Texas Rangers and Cincinnati Reds.

High school
Before playing professionally, Adcock attended North Hardin High School. He was drafted by the Seattle Mariners in the fifth round of the 2006 Major League Baseball Draft and began his professional career that year.

Professional career

Seattle Mariners

With the AZL Mariners in 2006, Adcock went 0–2 with a 3.31 ERA in 10 games (three starts). In 2007, he went 3–11 with a 4.58 ERA in 22 games (21 starts) for the Wisconsin Timber Rattlers and High Desert Mavericks. He pitched for Wisconsin again in 2008, going 2–5 with a 3.72 ERA in 15 games (14 starts), striking out 82 batters in 77 1/3 innings. He began the 2009 season with High Desert.

Pittsburgh Pirates
On July 29, 2009, he was traded with Ronny Cedeño, Jeff Clement, Aaron Pribanic and Brett Lorin to the Pittsburgh Pirates for Ian Snell and Jack Wilson. He finished the year with the Lynchburg Hillcats and went 8–9 with a 5.29 ERA in 28 games (23 starts) that season. In 2010, he went 11–7 with a 3.38 ERA in 27 games (26 starts) for the Bradenton Marauders. He was taken by the Kansas City Royals in the 2010 Rule 5 Draft.

Kansas City Royals
He was taken by the Kansas City Royals in the 2010 Rule 5 Draft. Adcock made his major league debut on March 31, 2011, which was Opening Day. He pitched a scoreless eighth inning against the Los Angeles Angels of Anaheim.

Arizona Diamondbacks
On June 13, 2013, the Arizona Diamondbacks claimed Adcock off of waivers and assigned him to the Reno Aces of the Class AAA Pacific Coast League.

Texas Rangers
Adcock signed a minor league deal with the Texas Rangers organization on December 5, 2013.

Cincinnati Reds
On December 23, 2014, Adcock signed a minor league deal with the Cincinnati Reds. On July 31, 2015, it was discovered by doctors that Adcock sustained a tear in his ulnar collateral and would need Tommy John surgery, ending his season.

Baltimore Orioles
On February 29, 2016, Adcock signed a minor league deal with the Baltimore Orioles. He elected free agency on November 6, 2017.

Post playing career
On November 7, 2018, Adcock was hired as an area scout for the Miami Marlins, ending his playing career.

Pitching style
Adcock was a sinkerballer. His sinker was thrown in the low 90s and had superb movement; it averaged nearly a foot of tailslide break away from left-handers and in toward right-handers. Complementing his sinker were a four-seam fastball, slider, curveball, and changeup.

References

External links

Living people
1988 births
Baseball players from Kentucky
People from Elizabethtown, Kentucky
Major League Baseball pitchers
Kansas City Royals players
Texas Rangers players
Cincinnati Reds players
Arizona League Mariners players
High Desert Mavericks players
Wisconsin Timber Rattlers players
Lynchburg Hillcats players
Bradenton Marauders players
Surprise Saguaros players
Omaha Storm Chasers players
Reno Aces players
Round Rock Express players
Louisville Bats players